The 1964 Florida Gators football team represented the University of Florida during the 1964 NCAA University Division football season. The season was the fifth for Ray Graves as the head coach of the Florida Gators football team.    Graves' 1964 Florida Gators posted an overall record of 7–3 and a 4–2 Southeastern Conference (SEC) record, tying for second among the eleven SEC teams.

Before the season
The season was Steve Spurrier's first season as quarterback.

Schedule

Primary source: 2015 Florida Gators Football Media Guide

Attendance figures: University of Florida 1965 Football Brochure.

Roster

Season summary

SMU
The season opened with a 24–8 win over the SMU Mustangs. After quarterback Tom Shannon led the Gators to a 10–8 halftime lead, Spurrier entered the contest and threw a 56-yard pass to Jack Harper.

Mississippi State
In the second week of play, the Gators beat the Mississippi State Bulldogs 16–13.

Ole Miss
Florida beat Ole Miss 30–14.

South Carolina
At homecoming, Florida beat South Carolina 37–0.

Alabama

Sources:

As they entered their 1964 homecoming game against Florida, Alabama was ranked No. 3 and Florida No. 9 in the AP Poll. Against the Gators, Alabama rallied for a 17–14 comeback victory after they scored ten unanswered points in the fourth quarter. After a scoreless first quarter, Florida took a 7–0 second quarter lead when Steve Spurrier threw a nine-yard touchdown pass to Randy Jackson. Alabama responded with a one-yard Steve Bowman touchdown run later in the quarter that tied the game 7–7 at halftime. In the third, the Gators retook the lead with a three-yard John Feiber touchdown run before the Crimson Tide started their fourth quarter rally. In the final period, a 30-yard Bowman touchdown run tied the game and a 21-yard David Ray field goal with just 3:06 left in the game. Spurrier then led the Gators on a drive that stalled at the Tide's seven-yard line where James Hall missed a field goal to tie the game and preserved the 17–14 Alabama win.

Auburn
The Gators beat the favored Auburn Tigers 14–0. The Gators picked off four passes, returning one for an 84-yard touchdown, and recovered three fumbles. Spurrier ran in the final score from 5 yards out.

Georgia
Despite Georgia's overall advantage in the series, Florida enjoyed a 10–2 streak from 1952 to 1963 under head coaches Bob Woodruff and Ray Graves. That changed with the arrival of Vince Dooley as the new head coach of the underdog 1964 Georgia Bulldogs.  In a game where the Bulldogs' quarterback failed to complete a single pass and was intercepted twice, Dooleys' 'Dogs relied on their running game, a staunch second-half defense, and a little bit of luck to beat Graves' tenth-ranked Gators.  With the game tied at 7–7 in the fourth quarter, Bulldogs placekicker Bob Etter lined up for a potential game-winning field goal.  Instead, in a wild broken play, the Bulldogs' center and placeholder mishandled the snap, but Etter picked up the bobbled ball and ran it for a touchdown to win the game 14–7.

Florida State
This season was also notable as the first in which the Florida State Seminoles defeated the Gators. Even though many of the early games in the series were close (and the 1961 contest ended in a 3–3 tie), Florida State had yet to beat their in-state rivals in six attempts. The 1964 game would be the first time that the Gators would journey to Doak Campbell Stadium, and the Seminoles under coach Bill Peterson were enjoying their best season since joining the ranks of major college football programs. However, the Gators still felt confident that another victory was in the offing, coming out onto the playing field with the boast "Never, FSU, Never!" attached to their helmets.

Florida State quarterback Steve Tensi hit Fred Biletnikoff with a first-half touchdown, helping the Seminoles to a 13–0 lead at the half as the Gator offense fumbled four times, including once at the FSU one-yard line. Florida, led by quarterback Steve Spurrier, finally scored in the 3rd quarter to cut the lead to 13–7, but were unable to find the endzone again. Les Murdock kicked a 42-yard field goal to secure the win for FSU, 16–7.

Miami
Florida defeated the Miami Hurricanes 12–10.

LSU
During the buildup to the 1964 game in Baton Rouge, all signs pointed to an exciting game to be played, with LSU playing especially hot at the time. UF, though unranked, was beginning to make some waves of its own with an exciting up-and-coming young player (and future Heisman Trophy winner) named Steve Spurrier. Then, after being delayed several weeks to the season finale due to Hurricane Hilda, the game ended up being anticlimactic with UF rolling to a surprisingly easy 20–6 win over the No. 7 Tigers. Particularly noteworthy is the fact that it was Spurrier's first win over LSU – the first of a long win streak that he would have over the Tigers as a player and head coach.

References

Florida
Florida Gators football seasons
Florida Gators football